This is a list of recreational walks in the ceremonial county of Cheshire. The list includes walks that are wholly inside Cheshire and also those that pass through to another county. The walks are generally through countryside on a variety of trails and footpaths. Small walks of local interest only are not included. There are 1,864 miles  (3,000 km) of public rights of way in Cheshire, England.

List of walking trails in Cheshire

See also

Long-distance footpaths in the UK
List of parks and open spaces in Cheshire

References



External links
Discovercheshire website – interactive maps featuring council maintained walking routes – with downloadable directions
Cheshire and Wirral walking books

Footpaths in Cheshire
Tourist attractions in Cheshire
British entertainment-related lists
recreational_walks_in_Cheshire